Inverness Caledonian Thistle F.C. competed in the Scottish Second Division in season 1998–99 and the Scottish League Cup and Scottish Cup.

Results

Scottish Second Division

Final League table

Scottish League Cup

Scottish Cup

References
caleythistleonline

Inverness Caledonian Thistle F.C. seasons
Inverness Caledonian Thistle